Zinni is a surname. Notable people with the surname include:

Andrew Zinni (born 1965), Australian soccer player
Anthony Zinni (born 1943), United States Marine Corps general and writer
Michael Zinni (1948–2014), American golfer
Stefan Zinni (born 1996), Australian soccer player